Craig Shaffer (born March 31, 1959) is a former American football linebacker. He played for the  St. Louis Cardinals from 1982 to 1984.

References

1959 births
Living people
American football linebackers
Indiana State Sycamores football players
St. Louis Cardinals (football) players
Edmonton Elks players
Ottawa Rough Riders players